Angelino Heights, alternately spelled Angeleno Heights, is one of the oldest neighborhoods in Los Angeles. Situated between neighboring  Chinatown and Echo Park, the neighborhood is known for its concentration of eclectic architectural styles from three eras:  The Victorian, Turn of the Century and Revival eras. Carroll Avenue is listed on the National Register of Historic Places and there are over thirty Historic-Cultural Monuments in the neighborhood.

History

Originally spelled Angeleno Heights, Angelino Heights is second only to Bunker Hill as the oldest district in Los Angeles outside of Downtown. Founded in 1886, it was originally connected to the downtown mainline (which ran east to west on Temple Street) by the Temple Street Cable Railway and later by streetcars.  It is known for its steep hills.  The district contains many notable examples of Victorian architecture, particularly of the Eastlake and Queen Anne styles, and though found throughout the neighborhood, they are especially concentrated on Carroll Avenue. 
Traveling around the neighborhood, one also discovers that many other styles of architecturally significant homes are to be found here, such as Craftsman, Bungalow, Mission Revival, Art Deco, and Colonial Revival, to name a few.

A large swath of Angelino Heights was destroyed to build the Hollywood Freeway, which cut it off from Temple Street save for an overpass at Edgeware Road.

Angelino Heights was the City of Los Angeles' first recognized historic district. The Angelino Heights Historic Preservation Overlay Zone (HPOZ) was enacted in 1981 and prohibits unsympathetic remodeling of historic houses and requires new construction to resemble original architecture in scale, massing and materials.

Geography
Angelino Height's boundaries include the Hollywood Freeway to the south, Sunset Boulevard to the north and east, and Echo Park Lake to the west.  Sunset Boulevard is the main thoroughfare.  Angelino Heights is situated on a hill of about 502 feet in elevation.

Police service
The neighborhood is served by the Los Angeles Police Department's Rampart Community Police Station located at 1401 West 6th Street.

Education
Angelino Heights is zoned to Los Angeles USD schools.

For elementary school, residents are zoned to either Plasencia Elementary School or Logan Elementary.  For middle school, residents are zoned to either King Middle School or Virgil Middle School.  For high school, all residents are zoned to Belmont High School.

National Register and Historic-Cultural Monuments
The 1300 block of Carroll Avenue (between Edgeware and Douglas Streets) is listed in the National Register of Historic Places. It contains the highest concentration of 19th century Victorian homes in Los Angeles. Additionally, there are over 30 homes in Angelino Heights that have been designated as Historic-Cultural Monuments.

In media 

 1324 Carroll Avenue - Grandma Lilly’s home in Grandma's Boy.
  1329 Carroll Avenue - appeared in the TV series Charmed and the films Deuce Bigalow: Male Gigolo and Earthquake.
 1345 Carroll Avenue - the setting for Michael Jackson's Thriller music video. The 3,532-square-foot Queen Anne style house was originally built for a local warehouse operator named Michael Sanders in 1887.  The Sanders House was also featured in a Season 4 episode of Charmed, as well as the movie Teen Witch.
  Our Neighborhoods with Huell Howser - the neighborhood was profiled in 2002.

References

External links

 Los Angeles Times, West Magazine: "Angelino Heights" (12 Feb 2006)Los Angeles Times, Real Estate section, Neighborly Advice column: "Preserving L.A.'s past in Angelino Heights" (13 Feb 2005)
 Historic 1300 Carroll Avenue/Morales House
 Angelino Heights Photo Gallery

Echo Park, Los Angeles
Neighborhoods in Los Angeles
Central Los Angeles
Northwest Los Angeles
Los Angeles Historic Preservation Overlay Zones
Populated places established in 1886
1886 establishments in California
19th century in Los Angeles